The 2015 New South Wales Cup season, was the second tier rugby league competition held in New South Wales, after the National Rugby League. The 2015 season kicked off on 7 March 2015 and was won by the Newcastle Knights.

Clubs
In 2015, 12 clubs are fielding teams in the New South Wales Cup.

It was announced in 2014 that the longstanding relationship between the Sydney Roosters and the Newtown Jets has come to an end, with the NRL Club deciding to now link with the Wyong Roos in the NSW Cup as their feeder club. The Cronulla Sharks have decided to pull their own team from the competition opting into taking the Newtown Jets on as their feeder club, forming a new relationship with a 3-year agreement between the clubs.

*: The season the team joined is in the NSW Cup, not any other competition before this.

Ladder

Ladder Progression 
 Underline = BYE



Season

Round 1

Round 2

Round 3

Round 4

Round 5

Round 6

Round 7

Round 8

Round 9

Round 10

Round 11

Round 12

Round 13

Round 14

Round 15

Round 16

Round 17

Round 18

Round 19

Round 20

Round 21

Round 22

Round 23

Round 24

Round 25

Finals series
For the fourth year in a row, the NSWRL will use the finals system previously implemented by the ARL competition from the 1990s (also used by the Australian Football League) to decide the grand finalists from the top eight finishing teams.

Chart

2015 NRL State Championship match

From 2014 New South Wales Cup Premiers play against the Queensland Cup Premiers with the winner to be crowned the NRL State Champions.

Broadcast Information

Television

Fox Sports (Australia)
Fox Sports 1 provide live coverage of at least one match each week throughout the regular season along with selected finals.

Sky Sport (New Zealand)
Sky Sports NZ cover a number of New Zealand Warriors home matches. Some of these matches will be simulcast in Australia on Fox Sports 1 at their discretion.

Radio

Hawkesbury Radio
Hawkesbury Radio call a number of Panthers VB NSW Cup games  and some of Windsor Wolves games in the Ron Massey Cup where possible.

SteeleSports.com.au
Covering predominantly Newtown Jets home fixtures.

2GLF
2GLF provide coverage of a host of VB NSW Cup games with a specific charter of servicing teams such as the Tigers, Mounties, Bulldogs and Magpies.

Alive 90.5
ALIVE fm call selected Wentworthville Magpies home fixtures from Ringrose Park.

Triple H 100.1FM
Triple H call a few VB NSW Cup games from time to time where possible.

2GB
Provide score updates where possible during the regular season.

ABC Grandstand
Provide Full Time scores to their listeners as they become available throughout the weekend.

Ron Massey Cup

Ladder

Finals

Sydney Shield

Ladder

Two points deducted from Windsor for playing an unregistered player.

Finals

See also

References

External links

New South Wales Cup
2015 in Australian rugby league
2015 in New Zealand rugby league